Marcel Plasman (23 December 1924 – 28 July 2020) was a Belgian politician.

Biography
Plasman began his career as an employee of the Federation of Christian Mutualites. He also served as President of the Fédération nationale des associations médico-sociales from 1972 to 1973 and again from 1985 to 1987. He was President of the Association chrétienne des Invalides et Handicapés from 1975 to 1985 and President of the Confédération des Institutions hospitalières from 1974 to 1976 and 1984 to 1986.

Plasman was a member of the Centre démocrate humaniste (PSC) party and was elected to the communal council of Nivelles in 1964, serving until 1996. From 1977 to 1982 and from 1989 to 1995, he served as Mayor.

From 1971 to 1979, Plasman served in the Chamber of Representatives, representing the arrondissement of Nivelles. He left the Chamber in 1979 and was succeeded by Raymond Langendries. In 1977, he was appointed Minister of Pensions and Secretary of Social Affairs under the second government of Leo Tindemans.

Marcel Plasman died of pneumonia on 28 July 2020 at the age of 95.

References

1924 births
2020 deaths
20th-century Belgian politicians
21st-century Belgian politicians
Centre démocrate humaniste politicians
People from Braine-l'Alleud
Deaths from pneumonia in Belgium
Deaths from the COVID-19 pandemic in Belgium